is a railway station on the Minobu Line of Central Japan Railway Company (JR Central) located in the city of Fujinomiya, Shizuoka Prefecture, Japan.

Lines
Gendōji Station is served by the Minobu Line and is located 9.3 kilometers from the southern terminus of the line at Fuji Station.

Layout
Gendōji Station has two opposed ground-level island platforms serving two tracks connected by a level crossing at the end of the platforms. The station building has automated ticket machines, automated turnstiles and is unattended.

Platforms

Adjacent stations

History
When the line was leased to the national government from October 1, 1938, it was elevated to Gendōji Station for both passenger and freight services. It came under control of the Japanese Government Railways (JGR) on May 1, 1941. The JGR became the JNR (Japan National Railway) after the end of World War II. Freight services were discontinued in 1971, the same year that the tracks from Fuji to Fujinomiya were expanded to a double track system. Along with the division and privatization of JNR on April 1, 1987, the station came under the control and operation of the Central Japan Railway Company.

Station numbering was introduced to the Minobu Line in March 2018; Gendōji Station was assigned station number CC05.

Passenger statistics
In fiscal 2017, the station was used by an average of 823 passengers daily (boarding passengers only).

Surrounding area
The station is located in a suburban residential area of Fujinomiya.

See also
 List of railway stations in Japan

References

External links
	
  Minobu Line station information 

Railway stations in Japan opened in 1938
Railway stations in Shizuoka Prefecture
Minobu Line
Fujinomiya, Shizuoka